Allison Pottinger  ( Darragh, born July 5, 1973) is an American curler from Eden Prairie, Minnesota. She is best known as having played for Debbie McCormick in multiple Olympics and World Championships. McCormick left the team in 2010. She competed in the 2010 Winter Olympic Games, in Vancouver, Canada. She was named USA female curling athlete of the year in 2008.

Career
Pottinger curls out of the St. Paul Curling Club in St. Paul, Minnesota. She learned how to curl in Otterburn Park, Quebec.

In 1994, Pottinger was an alternate for Erika Brown's silver medal-winning team at the 1994 World Junior Curling Championships. Pottinger picked up another silver medal at the 1996 World Curling Championships as the lead for Lisa Schoeneberg. In 1999, Pottinger won another silver medal, this time playing second for Patti Lank. In 2003, she had moved up to the position of third, and played for Debbie McCormick. In 2003, they won the first gold medal for an American team at the World Curling Championships. They would go to the Worlds again in 2006, where they won a silver medal.

Upon their semifinal win at the 2012 United States Women's Curling Championship, Pottinger and her team were qualified to participate at the 2014 United States Olympic Curling Trials. Her team lost in the trials, but Pottinger was selected as the Alternate for the victorious team (which includes former teammate McCormick). Pottinger attended the 2014 Olympics but was not selected to play in any matches for Team USA.

Personal life
Pottinger is a consumer insights manager with Rakuten Intelligence. She graduated from the University of Wisconsin–Oshkosh and has bachelor's degrees in Political Science and History. She earned an MBA in Marketing at the University of Wisconsin–Milwaukee. She is married to Doug Pottinger and has two children.

Awards
 USA Curling Female Athlete of the Year: 2008, 2012
 USA Curling Team of the Year: 1999, 2003

Teams

Women's

Mixed doubles

Mixed

Grand Slam record

References

External links

1973 births
Living people
American female curlers
Olympic curlers of the United States
Curlers at the 2010 Winter Olympics
Curlers at the 2014 Winter Olympics
World curling champions
University of Wisconsin–Oshkosh alumni
University of Wisconsin–Milwaukee alumni
Sportspeople from Brampton
Sportspeople from the Minneapolis–Saint Paul metropolitan area
Curlers from Ontario
People from Montérégie
People from Greater Montreal
People from Eden Prairie, Minnesota
American curling champions
Continental Cup of Curling participants
Canadian emigrants to the United States
Canadian women curlers
21st-century American women